Thirteen people have served as Leader of the Opposition of Malta since the office was established in 1921. The post did not exist in the period between 1933 and 1947, nor between 1958 and 1962.

List of officeholders
Political parties

See also
 Leader of the Opposition of Malta
 Prime Minister of Malta
 President of Malta 
 Government of Malta
 House of Representatives of Malta

References

List
Opposition
Lists of leaders of the Opposition